California's 24th district may refer to:

 California's 24th congressional district
 California's 24th State Assembly district
 California's 24th State Senate district